The Sangarius Bridge or Bridge of Justinian (Turkish: Justinianos Köprüsü or Beşköprü) is a late Roman bridge over the river Sakarya (Greek Σαγγάριος) in Anatolia, in modern-day Turkey. It was built by the East Roman Emperor Justinian I (527-565 AD) to improve communications between the capital Constantinople and the eastern provinces of his empire. With a remarkable length of 430 m, the bridge was mentioned by several contemporary writers, and has been associated with a supposed project, first proposed by Pliny the Younger to Emperor Trajan, to construct a navigable canal that would bypass the Bosporus.

Location and history 
The Sangarius Bridge is located in northwestern Anatolia, in the ancient region of Bithynia, ca. 5 km southwest of the town of Adapazarı. Today, the bridge spans the small Çark Deresi stream (called Melas in Antiquity), which flows from the nearby Sapanca Lake; the modern course of the far wider Sakarya lies 3 km to the East.

In Antiquity and all the way up to the Middle Ages, the bridge served an important purpose: it was the crossing-point of the strategically important  military road from the Bosporus to the eastern provinces of the Roman Empire, which were threatened by the Sassanid Empire. Before the stone bridge was constructed, a wooden pontoon bridge existed, which, according to Procopius, was frequently washed away when the river flooded, costing many men their lives.

The date of construction for the stone bridge can be accurately determined from contemporary sources: two laudatory poems of Paul the Silentiary and Agathias, dating to the year 562, celebrate its completion, and the chronicler Theophanes records that the work began in Anno Mundi 6052, which corresponds to 559–560. Conversely, since Procopius states that the bridge was still under construction when he wrote his work on Justinian's building projects (De Aedificiis), this would mean that it was written in the years 560–561 and celebrated in 562, five to six years later than earlier presumed. However, given that Theophanes' dating is somewhat inaccurate, it may well be that the bridge's construction had originally started in ca. 554.

Construction 
The bridge is built of blocks of limestone, and, including the abutments at each end, totals 429 m in length, with a width of 9.85 m and a height of up to 10 m. The bridge rests on seven main arches. The central five arches span ranges from 23 to 24.5 m, with the piers between them ca. 6 m thick. They are complemented on either side by a smaller arch with a span of ca. 20 m. The Çark Deresi stream flows through one of the western arches today. In addition, there are further five arches (two in the western and three in the eastern ends) of between 3 and 9 m on the banks of the river bed, which served as spillways in case the river overflowed. The eastern part of the bridge has been partially destroyed by the construction of a railway line along the river's course. The seven main piers were apparently decorated with small Christian crosses, which, with the exception of two, seem to have been destroyed.

In detail, the width of the main architectural elements (spans in bold, piers in parentheses) are, in meters:
3 (N.A.) 7 (9.5) 19.5 (6) 23 (6) 24.5 (6) 24.5 (6) 24 (6) 24.5 (6) 20 (9.5) 9 (N.A.) 6 (N.A.) 3

The piers are shaped so as to act as cutwaters, rounded on the upstream and pointed on the downstream side. The only exception is the broadest pier on the western shore, which is wedge-shaped on both sides. This feature of the Sangarius bridge sets it apart from most known Roman bridges, which usually feature pointed cut-waters upstream, and – if existing – also downstream.

On the western entrance a triumphal arch stood, while on the eastern side there are the remains of an apse, whose function is unclear, but possibly served as a religious shrine. The apse features an East-oriented half-dome, and is 11 m high and 9 m wide. The remains of the arch, now vanished, are illustrated in the sketches made in 1838 by Léon de Laborde: they depict an arched doorway, made of stone masonry, lying immediately at the entrance of the bridge. The next sketch provides some measured dimensions: the doorway was 10.37 m high and 6.19 m wide, while the pillars to either side were 4.35 m thick.

The bridge was also adorned by an inscription bearing an epigram in greek by Agathias. The inscription has not survived, but its content has been preserved in the writings of Emperor Constantine VII Porphyrogenitus:

Gallery

See also 
 List of Roman bridges
 Roman architecture
 Roman engineering

References

Sources

External links 

Roman bridges in Turkey
Deck arch bridges
Stone bridges in Turkey
Bridges completed in the 6th century
6th century in the Byzantine Empire
Buildings of Justinian I
Byzantine Bithynia
Arch bridges in Turkey
World Heritage Tentative List for Turkey